Cantharis is a large genus of soldier beetles in the family Cantharidae with narrow and soft elytra.

The poisonous Spanish fly is superficially similar and is associated with the scientific name Cantharis vesicatoria. It is also sometimes called "cantharis" in the vernacular, but it is actually unrelated to Cantharis and is not a member of the Cantharidae at all. It was classified there erroneously until Johan Christian Fabricius corrected its name in his Systema entomologiae in 1775. He reclassified the Spanish fly in the new genus Lytta as Lytta vesicatoria. It belongs to the family Meloidae.

European species

Subgenus Cantharis 

 Cantharis allosensis Pic, 1924
 Cantharis annularis Menetriez, 1836
 Cantharis antennalis (Marseul, 1864)
 Cantharis ariasi (Mulsant, 1862)
 Cantharis assimilis Paykull, 1798
 Cantharis atrata (Marseul, 1864)
 Cantharis basithorax Pic, 1902
 Cantharis beckeri (Pic, 1902)
 Cantharis brevicornis (Kiesenwetter, 1852)
 Cantharis brullei (Marseul, 1864)
 Cantharis cedricola Wittmer, 1971
 Cantharis cornix (Abeille de Perrin, 1869)
 Cantharis coronata Gyllenhal, 1808
 Cantharis corvina Moscardini, 1962
 Cantharis cretica Wittmer, 1971
 Cantharis cryptica Ashe, 1947
 Cantharis cypria (Marseul, 1864)
 Cantharis darwiniana Sharp, 1867
 Cantharis decipiens Baudi, 1871
 Cantharis decolorans Brullé, 1832
 Cantharis delagrangei Delkeskamp, 1939
 Cantharis dissipata Gemminger, 1870
 Cantharis edentula Baudi, 1871
 Cantharis ephippigera (Brullé, 1832)
 Cantharis europea Pic 1921
 Cantharis falzonii Fiori 1914
 Cantharis figurata Mannerheim, 1843
 Cantharis flavilabris Fallén, 1807
 Cantharis franciana Kiesenwetter, 1866
 Cantharis fusca Linnaeus, 1758 - type species
 Cantharis fuscipennis (Mulsant, 1862)
 Cantharis hellenica Heyden, 1883
 Cantharis ictaria Fiori, 1914
 Cantharis inculta Gene, 1839
 Cantharis instabilis Kiesenwetter, 1866
 Cantharis italica Fiori, 1914
 Cantharis kervillei Pic, 1932
 Cantharis liburnica Depoli, 1912
 Cantharis livida Linnaeus, 1758
 Cantharis merula Moscardini, 1862
 Cantharis monacha Moscardini, 1862
 Cantharis montana Stierlin, 1889
 Cantharis morio Fabricius, 1792
 Cantharis nevadensis Pic, 1908
 Cantharis nigra (De Geer, 1774)
 Cantharis nigricans Müller, 1766
 Cantharis nigricornis (Laporte de Castelnau, 1840)
 Cantharis obscura Linnaeus, 1758
 Cantharis ochreata (Reiche, 1878)
 Cantharis paganettii (Flach, 1907)
 Cantharis palliata Gyllenhal, 1808
 Cantharis pallida Goeze, 1777
 Cantharis paludosa Fallén, 1807 
 Cantharis paradoxa Hicker, 1960
 Cantharis paulinoi Kiesenwetter, 1870
 Cantharis pellucida Fabricius, 1792
 Cantharis peninsularis Fiori, 1914
 Cantharis praecox Gene, 1836
 Cantharis prusiensis (Marseul, 1864)
 Cantharis pulicaria Fabricius, 1781
 Cantharis pyrenaea Pic, 1906
 Cantharis quadripunctata (Müller, 1776)
 Cantharis reichei Mulsant, 1862
 Cantharis rufa Linnaeus, 1758
 Cantharis rustica Fallén, 1807
 Cantharis schrammi Pic, 1907
 Cantharis seidlitzi Kiesenwetter, 1865
 Cantharis sicula Pic, 1906
 Cantharis smyrnensis (Marseul, 1864)
 Cantharis terminata Faldermann, 1835
 Cantharis torretasoi Wittmer, 1935
 Cantharis tristis Fabricius, 1797
 Cantharis versicolor (Baudi, 1871)
 Cantharis xanthoporpa Kiesenwetter, 1860

Subgenus Cyrtomoptila 
 Cantharis gemina Dahlgren, 1974
 Cantharis lateralis Linnaeus, 1758
 Cantharis pagana Rosenhauer, 1847

See also
 List of Cantharis species

References and notes

Further reading
 Wittmer W., Kasantsev S. (1997) On the classification of the genus Cantharis Linné (Coleoptera, Cantharidae). Entomologica Basiliensia 20: 367–372.

External links

 Biolib
 Fauna europaea

Cantharidae